is a 2008 action-adventure light gun shooter developed by Monolith Soft and published by Nintendo for the Wii. In it, the player must survive various natural disasters while also battling terrorists and rescuing civilians. According to Nintendo, the game features “cutting-edge physics and gripping visuals” to recreate the sheer terror of major catastrophes.

Plot 

Similar in style to Disaster Report, the game revolves around Raymond Bryce, a former US Marine in the Gulf War, and International Rescue Team (IRT) member. When Ray and his partner Steve Hewitt were performing a routine rescue mission near the South American dormant volcano in Mt. Aguilas, tragedy struck when the volcano unexpectedly erupted. During their escape, Steve died as he fell into the magma below, having let himself go from Ray's grasp as he knew only one of them would be able to escape to safety. During the eruption, Steve passed on an antique compass to Ray and made him promise to give it to his sister Lisa in case he didn't make it. Shortly after Steve's death, he resigned from the team, and was later recruited by Special FBI Agent Olson to be a liaison officer between the CMD and Blue Ridge City officials.

One year later, while Ray is still in despair from his partner's death. he is summoned at FBI Field Office in Blue Ridge City by Olson, who reveals that the ex-special forces military organization SURGE led by Colonel Haynes; the unit previously believed to be wiped out one year ago due to the eruption of Mt. Aguilas, has kidnapped seismologist Dr. Davis and his assistant Lisa Hewitt, and later made demands to the US President Lewis, threatening to detonate the stolen nuclear warheads as retaliation for the previous US administration's support of the tyrannical South American government they are seeking to overthrow. Ray decides to go with the team of soldiers from the Blue Ridge City Special Response Team (SRT); as they raid an abandoned office building used as SURGE's hideout, hoping to rescue Lisa in order to redeem himself for his partner's death. Ray finds the kidnapped victims, but is confronted by Gordon, SURGE's third in-command and training instructor, and his men. A firefight between Ray and Gordon ensues amidst a large earthquake, concluding with Gordon evacuating the building with Davis and Lisa to Mt. Rosalia. Ray also flees the building, and loses the pursuing soldiers in a high-speed chase, although they continue to chase him across the city's crumbling ruins.

Ray comes across and assists Blue Ridge City Mayor Townsend rescuing a man from the rubble, who tells Ray to go to West Park, which has been set up as an evacuation zone. However, once arrived, Ray finds himself and many others trapped as the fires spread towards them. With assistance from their fellow citizens, coordinated by Mayor Townsend, Ray was able to push the overturned bus out of the way, but he soon witnesses Townsend seemingly caught and burned to death by the fiery twister.

Raymond Bryce spots and crashes two armored vans, eliminates the entire SURGE's ground unit, and wounded Gordon in a gun battle. leaving the latter to die as the tsunami swamps the area, but not before taking the nuclear detonator. He manages to outrun from the tsunami, but is being pursued on-foot by SURGE's combat pilot, Gregory, and both of them got caught by a tsunami, although they survive. Ray was able to put Gregory down, but is carried away by the current once more, losing his consciousness until he wakes up at the mountainside park, where he finds that Mayor Townsend has survived the fire.

Under instructions from the radio Ray stole from SURGE's ground unit before the tsunami hit, he travels to an old geothermal plant at Mt. Rosalia for an exchange with the detonator for Lisa's life, but their negotiations were interrupted when Mt. Rosalia erupts. Ray fights his way through the abandoned geothermal plant before finding Lisa and Davis, but was stopped by deputy leader & SURGE's second-in command Major Evans. Ray speedily outruns from the pyroclastic cloud, but he is eventually caught inside it. Iris, a 13-year-old girl; who was waiting for her parents, finds Ray collapsed in the volcanic ash and saves him. Knowing that Iris' house might not be safe because of the volcanic debris flow, Ray decides to bring Iris and leave the area to find their way down the mountain. During their trek down from Mt. Rosalia, Ray kills an aggressive grizzly bear and two SURGE helicopter pilots, and he also rescues Iris as she is swept away by the lahar.

After Ray was able to call Agent Olson on his satellite phone, Iris and Ray part ways, as the former is taken away to the safe place while the latter continues to pursue SURGE as he is flown to Bainesville, the town that is already inundated with floods due to heavy rainfall stemming from the approaching hurricane, Ray fought his way through SURGE soldiers and the elements before making his way to the waterway and commandeers a boat towards the church, where it is used as SURGE's another hideout. Meanwhile, Lisa tries, but fails, to escape from Evans' grasp, and Professor Davis is killed while attempting to buy Lisa time to escape.

Raymond Bryce fights against Banks, SURGE's boorish, mercenary soldier, ending with the latter fleeing. Once arrived, he is surrounded by Colonel Haynes, Evans, and Banks, and is locked in the basement. However, Colonel Haynes – already swayed by Raymond Bryce's words, and after ordering the men to save the children, refuses to detonate the nuclear device set up in Miami, and kills Banks and several soldiers, but was gunned down by Major Evans. Ray frees Lisa and swam out to safety as the entire church is flooded, but Lisa is taken away by Evans, and escapes to Port Alex. After battling SURGE's troops amidst the strong hurricane, Ray finds Evans, Lisa and a massive battalion of SURGE's troops at the Seafront Highway in Port Alex., and despite Ray's best efforts, he was cornered. Just then, military reinforcements sent by Special Agent Olson arrives, and they are able to eliminate the soldiers with ease. Ray chases Evans towards the Ferry Terminal.

Ray enters the ferry as it was just about to depart, leaving him to fight the last resistance of the SURGE on his own, eventually finding Evans on the boat deck, turning into an intense conflict, such as Evans commandeering an experimental attack machine and a brutal hand-to-hand combat; both were defeated by Ray. However, Evans activates the nuclear warhead, which is located in one of the vans inside the ferry car deck, but was shortly killed by Haynes, who is revealed to be alive; although wounded. Despite Evans had thrown the detonator in the sea, Ray was able to manually disable the warhead before it explodes. Ray and Lisa boarded the lifeboat to escape, while Colonel Haynes stayed behind, who dies as the ferry sank beneath the waves. Ray and Lisa was later rescued by Special Agent Olson.

In the post-credits scene, Iris is finally reunited by her parents at the stadium in Blue Ridge City. Ray; having able to come to terms with his partner's death and rejoined the International Rescue Team, and Lisa visits Steve's grave, asking him to watch over them. In the alternative ending, President Lewis receives a report that an asteroid is approaching the planet of Earth, threatening to destroy all mankind.

Gameplay 
In Disaster, players control Ray from a third-person point of view during cinematic adventure sections, with the player taking on jumping puzzles and navigating hazards that can hurt or kill Ray.. In these sections, a number of Quick Time Events and minigames will be based around the motion controls of the Remote and Nunchuk. For example, the player can perform actions such as pressing buttons in rhythm to perform CPR, moving heavy objects and running from flood waters and lava flows by quickly moving the Wii Remote and Nunchuk, and driving a car by holding the Wii Remote on its side and tilting it left or right. The player may also come face to face with a peculiar man with a fedora and cane who will offer unique shooting range tickets.

Disaster's core combat is primarily played out as a rail shooter, akin to that of Duck Hunt or Time Crisis,  that use the Wii Remote's pointer function to target enemies. The player can hold up to three weapons of their choosing, along with one mandatory pistol with unlimited ammo cache and can swap freely using the Direction Pad. Shooting Range tickets can also grant unique weapons to Ray if their challenge criteria are met. During the combat sequences, the player can duck, take cover if available and shoot more accurately by using a temporary ability to concentrate for double damage, called Zoom Mode. Taking cover makes Ray invulnerable to damage at the cost of being unable to shoot and has no general penalty outside of naturally lost stamina in drawn out battles by the player's discression. Taking too long without proper self care may result in HP consumption in place of Stamina Consumption until Ray is fed properly.

Players will have to keep an eye on Ray's survival stats at all times, such as stamina, heartrate and lung clarity, which can be depleted by strenuous activities or exposure to smoke and poisonous fumes. To stay heathy, food and snacks generally replenish stamina and taking in rhythmic, well timed deep breaths of fresh air respectively are essential for survival.  Rescuing survivors involves bringing them to safety or completing a first aid minigame before their stamina meter depletes and they die. Successful rescuing of enough survivors will automatically extend Ray's maximum health by one unit.

During the game players will be able to improve Ray's skills, including his strength, accuracy with firearms and mental concentration by collecting "Survival Points" (SP) earned by rescuing civilians, while "Battle Points" (BP) earned from killing SURGE members can be used to purchase and upgrade Ray's weapons and equipment.

The game covers 23 stages which can be replayed for a higher score. The game also includes a shooting range, "stamina challenges", unlockable weapons and costumes and a more difficult "Real Disaster Mode".

Development
Disaster: Day of Crisis is Monolith Soft's first game to be developed for the Wii, conceived after the developers decided to make a brand new game that plays to the strengths of the platform instead of porting the GameCube game Baten Kaitos Origins to it.

Release
Although initially there was little information about the game after its debut E3 2006 announcement, an interview with then-Nintendo of America marketing director Beth Llewelyn during E3 2007 revealed that Disaster was still in development.

The April 2008 issue of the Japanese video game magazine Famitsu later revealed the release date for Japan was to be July 3, 2008, but on May 17, 2008, Monolith announced that the release date for Disaster had been "postponed indefinitely" to “increase the quality of the finished product”. However, on August 13, 2008, the website of the Australian Office of Film and Literature Classification listed the game with an M rating, suggesting it was nearing completion. Nintendo also stated that the game was "still in development" on August 19, 2008.

Japanese TV spots later confirmed a release date of September 25, 2008 in Japan. The European Nintendo website also confirmed a European release for October 24, 2008.

The game's North American release was cancelled due to poor sales outside the country and the fact that Reggie Fils-Aime, then-president of Nintendo America, hated the game, calling it laughable and overpriced.

Reception

Disaster: Day of Crisis received "average" reviews according to the review aggregation website Metacritic. Famitsu gave Disaster a score of 34 out of 40. Official Nintendo Magazine praised the presentation and the mix of gameplay styles; though they felt the enemy AI was "woeful", the game was described as "a really enjoyable arcade-style experience." Siliconera likened it to "a vapid, but fun to watch summer action movie". IGN claimed Disaster delivers fun in "huge, preposterous spades", and believed the mix of genres and gameplay mechanics to be "relentlessly unpredictable and gloriously compulsive". However, they also found problems with the game's pacing, increasingly repetitive combat and adventuring, and unbalanced driving sections, and felt that some players will be put off by the number of "abstract game mechanics wrestled into a single plot-driven narrative". Cubed³ called Disaster "completely mesmerising", despite an inconsistent visual quality and difficulty level, praising the intentionally cheesy dialogue, high level of interactivity and "rousing" soundtrack.  N-Europe said that while the game can be "great fun" and "brilliantly atmospheric", it is held back by poor graphics and lacklustre physics, especially in the driving segments.

In contrast, GameSpot called the game "unfocused and scatterbrained", with "lackluster" graphics and sound. Eurogamer also found fault with the unfocused and confusing mix of genres and had control issues with the driving and adventuring sections, though they called the shooter segments "lots of fun" and the plot entertaining and "unwittingly hilarious beyond belief".

In its first week of sales in Japan, Disaster sold more than 13,000 copies. After its first month, it had sold 21,464 copies in Japan.

References

External links

Japanese website
UK website

2008 video games
Monolith Soft games
Nintendo games
Survival video games
Video games about terrorism
Video games developed in Japan
Wii-only games
Wii games
Single-player video games
Video games about disasters
Video games using Havok
Action-adventure games
Light gun games